The Embassy of Sweden in Washington, D.C. is Sweden's diplomatic mission in the United States. The Swedish Embassy in Washington, D.C. is one of Sweden's largest diplomatic missions with more than fifty employees. Ambassador since 2017 is Karin Olofsdotter. Sweden also has a Consulate General in New York City and a number of Honorary Consulates General in the United States. Since 2006, the embassy is located in the House of Sweden building on the Potomac River.

History
Swedish-American relations have a long history stretching back to the 17th century when Sweden in 1638 established the colony of New Sweden in the state of Delaware. In 1782, diplomatic relations were established by Samuel Gustaf Hermelin. Sweden was the first country, in addition to the states that were directly involved in the American Revolutionary War (the United Kingdom and France), to recognize the United States in 1783. In 1783 the Treaty of Amity and Commerce between Sweden and the United States was signed.

A break in diplomatic relations occurred in 1973 when the then Ambassador Hubert de Bèsche and his newly elected successor Yngve Möller were declared undesirable in the United States as a result of a diplomatic crisis that followed Olof Palme's statement about the Hanoi bombings in December 1972. In 1974 the new Swedish Ambassador Wilhelm Wachtmeister took office and held the post until 1989. Wachtmeister was eventually given the title Dean of the Diplomatic Corps (Doyen) as the longest serving Ambassador in Washington, D.C. Other famous diplomats who held the Ambassador post are Jan Eliasson, Rolf Ekéus and Anders Thunborg.

The former embassy building was located at 2006 N Street, N.W., in a Victorian building at 2249 R Street, N.W.,  from 1921 to 1971 and in Suite 1200, Watergate Six Hundred, 600 New Hampshire Avenue along the banks of the Potomac River. When the rent in the Watergate complex became too high, the embassy was moved to a couple of floors at 1501 M Street, N.W. in Downtown. The idea had been for several decades to acquire an own embassy building but the idea had come unstuck because of few suitable sites.

In August 2006, the embassy returned to the banks of the Potomac River when the new embassy building, the House of Sweden, opened on the waterfront in Georgetown. The site was bought by the National Property Board of Sweden from the Swede Kate Novak's husband Alan Novak's development company.

Buildings

Embassy building

The embassy has since 2006 been housed on the second floor of the then newly built and later the award-winning office and residential complex House of Sweden on the Potomac River in Georgetown. House of Sweden is the result after an architectural competition which the National Property Board of Sweden announced in June 2002. The winning entry was selected by the jury in January 2003 and construction began in August 2004. In August 2006 the embassy staff moved in. The opening ceremony was held on 23 October 2006, in the presence of the King and Queen of Sweden.

The building was designed by architects Gert Wingårdh and Tomas Hansen and Wingårdh received the Architects Sweden's (Sveriges Arkitekter) Kasper Salin Prize in 2007 for the building. The Washington Post named the House of Sweden the "Venue of the Year" in 2008. The cost of construction amounted to 482 million SEK. House of Sweden houses the embassy building, embassy offices, 19 apartments and a  event center with conference facilities and exhibition spaces. In 2009 Sweden and Iceland signed a 15-year long contract for office and a residential apartment for the Embassy of Iceland in the House of Sweden.

Residence
The ambassadorial residence is located at 3900 Nebraska Avenue, N.W. The Spanish-influenced residence on Nebraska Avenue was designed by American architect Arthur B. Heaton. For several years, the building housed David F. Lawrence, one of the Washington's more well-known newspaper publishers.

The residence is decorated with Swedish classics, including rugs by Märta Måås-Fjetterström, Gustavian furniture, art by Stellan Mörner, Olle Bærtling and Fredrik Reuterswärd. The gallery has French woven wallpapers from the late 1600s and early 1700s with landscape motifs. Thousands of guests to the Swedish ambassador and his family enjoy the Swedish decor every year.

The residence features a garden, greenhouse, and tennis court. There, former Ambassador Wilhelm Wachtmeister used to play tennis with President George H. W. Bush. In June 2019, a decision was taken to sell the residence and that the Swedish ambassador would move into House of Sweden.

Heads of Mission

Footnotes

References

External links

Embassy of Sweden, Washington, D.C.

Washington, D.C.
Sweden–United States relations
Sweden